Luigi Arcangeli (1902 - 23 May 1931) was an Italian motorcycle and car racer.

Biography
Arcangeli was born at Forlì in 1894.

A factory rider for Sarolea, Sunbeam, Bianchi and Moto Guzzi, he turned  to four wheels in the wake of his friend Tazio Nuvolari. His first appearance was a win in 1928 at the Circuito di Senigallia with a 2-litre Bugatti. After Bugatti he drove Talbot-Darracqs, winning at Cremona in 1928, continuing with Maserati Tipo 8C-2500, with a first place at the Rome Grand Prix in 1930. Later he moved to Alfa Romeo and joined Enzo Ferrari's scuderia with Nuvolari as team mate. Arcangeli died the following year at Monza, during the tests for the Italian Grand Prix, while driving an Alfa Romeo Tipo A.

Arcangeli was killed in Monza while driving Alfa Romeo Tipo A. A Scuderia Luigi Arcangeli was created to honor Luigi Arcangeli name. The Scuderia is active nowadays, building ArcangeliMoto regolarità race bikes in limited numbers.

References

External links

Bio page at ruoteclassiche website 

Year of birth uncertain
1931 deaths
People from Forlì
Racing drivers who died while racing
Italian motorcycle racers
Italian racing drivers
Grand Prix drivers
Sport deaths in Italy
Isle of Man TT riders
Sportspeople from the Province of Forlì-Cesena